Football was a popular sport in the Soviet Union, with the national football championships being one of the major annual sporting events. Youth and children competitions as a regular event started after the war and each team of masters (official designation for professional team) in the top two tiers were fielding its youth squad in separate competition. Women official competitions started only 1990, just before dissolution of the Soviet Union.

Football in the Soviet Union existed in realities of the economy and law of the Soviet Union where state owned everything and professional sports were prohibited. The way the Soviet sports administrators were going around that limitation is that they were placing athletes as employees of either a state enterprise or a state government department, to which a sports society belonged or assigned. Therefore, in the Soviet Union existed two statuses for footballers: amateur and non-amateur.

History
Before the revolution of 1917, football was quite widespread in the Russian Empire. In 1914, the Russian Football Union included representatives from 33 cities, while the number of football teams was close to two hundred and the number of registered players - five thousand. There were only two championships played and one of them was unfinished due to the World War I. The All-Russian competitions were conducted among the united city teams composed of better players from each of the city's championships. Interest in football has not fallen, and after the revolution, the number of football teams continued to grow. And soon, along with urban and territorial competitions, it was decided to hold the championships of the Russian SFSR and the USSR. Until 1936, teams representing cities and republics, as opposed to club teams, took part in these competitions.

It was not until 1924 when the first All-Union championship was held. They were organized five times in total (1924, 1928, 1931, 1932 and 1935). In the first three tournaments, the team participated republics and cities, only two of the latter city.

Since 1936, the USSR championships for club teams representing companies and institutions were held annually, and in two cases (1936, 1976) - twice a year. They were interrupted only once, during the World War II Eastern Front (locally – the Great Patriotic War). Tournaments were notable for their organizational instability. The number of participating teams was constantly changing (ranging from 7 to 26), some of the changes taking place in the course of the championship tournament. The championship tournaments lasted from 57 to 282 days, they were played in one (1936, 1938, 1952, 1976) or two rounds, there were single and multi-stage ones (1960, 1961, 1962, 1969). Changes to the scoring system were also made - during different seasons, the number of points awarded for a draw was two, one, or even none. The name of the tournament itself was also changed over the years: группа «А» (Group A), класс «А» (Class A), I группа (Group I), I группа класса «А» (Group I Class A), высшая группа класса «А» (Top Group Class A), высшая лига (Top League).

In the second half of the 1980s, leading players of the Soviet teams began to move to foreign clubs. In 1990, Dinamo Tbilisi and Žalgiris Vilnius left the competitions of the Soviet Union. Other clubs had similar intentions but these plans were not implemented before the actual collapse of the Soviet Union. In 1991, the history of the football championships of the Soviet Union ended with the victory of FC CSKA Moscow. The Commonwealth of Independent States Cup, traditionally attended by the winners of national championships from the former Soviet republics, was a reminder of the existence of the USSR Championships.

Competitions

League (round-robin)
 Male
 Tier 1 – Top League (1971–1992)
 single group with number of participant and format changing
 Tier 2 – First League (1971–1991)
 single group for most of its history, inconsistency in number of participants and format
 Tier 3 – Buffer League (1990–1991)
 tier three competitions were oftentimes regional based with multiple groups (zones), introduced in 1990 the buffer league reduced number of groups to slim down the competition pyramid structure
 Tier 4 – Second League (1971–1991)
 Tier 5 – Group D
 tier five competitions existed in very early period before World War II for a short time
 Republican-level competitions
 Each union republic had its own separate competition including the Russian SFSR and was standardized as the competitions among the "collectives of physical culture" (KFK)
 Regional-level competitions
 competitions based on primary administrative division of the union republics including autonomous republics within those union republics as well as the federal-level cities of the Soviet Union
 Local-level competitions
 competitions of cities and smaller administrative division of the union republics
 Female
 Tier 1 – Top League (1990–1991)
 Tier 2 – First League (1990–1991)
 Tier 3 – Buffer League (1990–1991)

Cup (elimination)
 Soviet Cup
 Federation Cup
 First League Cup, other elimination-type competitions
 Soviet Women Cup

Unofficial
 Soviet Super Cup

Evolution of the Soviet football league system

National team

At its peak the Soviet national team was amongst the strongest in the world. The national team's greatest achievements was winning Euro 1960 and reaching the 1966 FIFA World Cup semi finals.

See also
For the correspondent article on each one of the republics, please see:
Football in Armenia
Football in Azerbaijan
Football in Belarus
Football in Estonia
Football in Georgia
Football in Kazakhstan
Football in Kyrgyzstan
Football in Latvia
Football in Lithuania
Football in Moldova
Football in Russia
Football in Tajikistan
Football in Turkmenistan
Football in Ukraine
Football in Uzbekistan

Others:
Football Federation of the Soviet Union
Soviet Top League
Soviet First League
Soviet Cup
USSR Super Cup
USSR Federation Cup
Soviet Union national football team

References

External links
 USSR (Soviet Union) - List of Champions at RSSSF.

 
1922 establishments in the Soviet Union
1991 disestablishments in the Soviet Union